John Kenneth Pennington (1927–25 August 2011) was a priest in the Church of England, Nottingham City councillor and Sheriff of Nottingham.

Family

He was born in Wigan in 1927. He studied law at the University of Manchester where he met his future wife, Jean. Rejecting a career in law, for two years he worked at a large textiles printing firm on Oxford Road before training for ordination at  Lincoln Theological College.

After working in Liverpool, Rotherham, India and Blackburn, he moved to Nottingham in 1966.

Ordained ministry

Pennington was ordained a deacon in 1952 and a priest in 1953. He held the following appointments:
 
Curate at Holy Trinity Church, Wavertree, Liverpool 1952–1956 
Curate at Rotherham 1956–1959
Priest in Charge at Christ Church College, Kanpur, Diocese of Lucknow 1959–1963
Vicar at St Philip's Church, Nelson 1964–1966
Area Secretary for USPG in Derby, Leicester and Southwell 1966–1971 
Area Secretary for USPG in Derby and Sheffield 1971–1975
Lecturer at St Mary's Church, Nottingham 1975–1992

Political career

Living in Nelson, Lancashire, he helped Sydney Silverman MP retain his seat of Nelson and Colne in the 1964 United Kingdom general election in a very difficult contest, beating a pro-capital punishment candidate who had suffered the murder of a relative.

He moved to Nottingham in 1966, was elected a Labour councillor in 1976 to represent Bestwood Park, and re-elected in 1979 to represent Bridge ward.

During his final year as councillor, in 1982–83, he was made Sheriff of Nottingham.

In 2006 he was made an honorary alderman of Nottingham.

References

1927 births
2011 deaths
Sheriffs of Nottingham
Nottingham City Councillors
20th-century English Anglican priests
People from Wigan
Alumni of the University of Manchester